This is a list of electoral divisions and wards in the ceremonial county of Derbyshire in the East Midlands. All changes since the re-organisation of local government following the passing of the Local Government Act 1972 are shown. The number of councillors elected for each electoral division or ward is shown in brackets.

County council

Derbyshire
Electoral Divisions from 1 April 1974 (first election 12 April 1973) to 7 May 1981:

Electoral Divisions from 7 May 1981 to 5 May 2005:

Electoral Divisions from 5 May 2005 to 2 May 2013:

Electoral Divisions from 2 May 2013 to present:

Unitary authority council

Derby
Wards from 1 April 1974 (first election 7 June 1973) to 3 May 1979:

Wards from 3 May 1979 to 2 May 2002:

Wards from 2 May 2002 to present:

District councils

Amber Valley
Wards from 1 April 1974 (first election 7 June 1973) to 3 May 1979:

Wards from 3 May 1979 to 4 May 2000:

Wards from 4 May 2000 to present:

Bolsover
Wards from 1 April 1974 (first election 7 June 1973) to 3 May 1979:

Wards from 3 May 1979 to 1 May 2003:

Wards from 1 May 2003 to 2 May 2019:

† minor boundary changes in 2015

Wards from 2 May 2019 to present:

Chesterfield
Wards from 1 April 1974 (first election 7 June 1973) to 3 May 1979:

Wards from 3 May 1979 to 1 May 2003:

Wards from 1 May 2003 to present:

Derbyshire Dales
Wards from 1 April 1974 (first election 7 June 1973) to 3 May 1979:

Wards from 3 May 1979 to 1 May 2003:

Wards from 1 May 2003 to present:

Erewash
Wards from 1 April 1974 (first election 7 June 1973) to 3 May 1979:

Wards from 3 May 1979 to 1 May 2003:

Wards from 1 May 2003 to 7 May 2015:

Wards from 7 May 2015 to present:

High Peak
Wards from 1 April 1974 (first election 7 June 1973) to 3 May 1979:

Wards from 3 May 1979 to 1 May 2003:

Wards from 1 May 2003 to 7 May 2015:

Wards from 7 May 2015 to present:

North East Derbyshire
Wards from 1 April 1974 (first election 7 June 1973) to 3 May 1979:

Wards from 3 May 1979 to 1 May 2003:

Wards from 1 May 2003 to 2 May 2019:

Wards from 2 May 2019 to present:

South Derbyshire
Wards from 1 April 1974 (first election 7 June 1973) to 3 May 1979:

Wards from 3 May 1979 to 1 May 2003:

Wards from 1 May 2003 to 5 May 2011:

Wards from 5 May 2011 to present:

Electoral wards by constituency

Amber Valley
Alfreton, Codnor and Waingroves, Heage and Ambergate, Heanor and Loscoe, Heanor East, Heanor West, Ironville and Riddings, Kilburn, Denby and Holbrook, Langley Mill and Aldercar, Ripley, Ripley and Marehay, Shipley Park, Horsley and Horsley Woodhouse, Somercotes, Swanwick, Wingfield.

Bolsover
Barlborough, Blackwell, Bolsover North West, Bolsover South, Bolsover West, Clowne North, Clowne South, Elmton-with-Creswell, Holmewood and Heath, Pilsley and Morton, Pinxton, Pleasley, Scarcliffe, Shirebrook East, Shirebrook Langwith, Shirebrook North West, Shirebrook South East, Shirebrook South West, Shirland, South Normanton East, South Normanton West, Sutton, Tibshelf, Whitwell.

Chesterfield
Brimington North, Brimington South, Brockwell, Dunston, Hasland, Hollingwood and Inkersall, Holmebrook, Linacre, Loundsley Green, Middlecroft and Poolsbrook, Moor, Old Whittington, Rother, St Helen's, St Leonard's, Walton, West.

Derby North
Abbey, Chaddesden, Darley, Derwent, Littleover, Mackworth, Mickleover.

Derby South
Alvaston, Arboretum, Blagreaves, Boulton, Chellaston, Normanton, Sinfin.

Derbyshire Dales
Alport, Ashbourne North, Ashbourne South, Bakewell, Bradwell, Brailsford, Calver, Carsington Water, Chatsworth, Clifton and Bradley, Crich, Darley Dale, Dovedale and Parwich, Doveridge and Sudbury, Hartington and Taddington, Hathersage and Eyam, Hulland, Lathkill and Bradford, Litton and Longstone, Masson, Matlock All Saints, Matlock St Giles, Norbury, South West Parishes, Stanton, Tideswell, Winster and South Darley, Wirksworth.

Erewash
Abbotsford, Breaston, Cotmanhay, Derby Road East, Derby Road West, Draycott, Hallam Fields, Ilkeston Central, Ilkeston North, Kirk Hallam, Little Hallam, Long Eaton Central, Nottingham Road, Old Park, Sandiacre North, Sandiacre South, Sawley, Wilsthorpe.

High Peak
Barms, Blackbrook, Burbage, Buxton Central, Chapel East, Chapel West, Corbar, Cote Heath, Dinting, Gamesley, Hadfield North, Hadfield South, Hayfield, Hope Valley, Howard Town, Limestone Peak, New Mills East, New Mills West, Old Glossop, Padfield, St John's, Sett, Simmondley, Stone Bench, Temple, Tintwistle, Whaley Bridge, Whitfield.

Mid Derbyshire
Allestree, Belper Central, Belper East, Belper North, Belper South, Duffield, Little Eaton and Breadsall, Oakwood, Ockbrook and Borrowash, Spondon, Stanley, West Hallam and Dale Abbey.

North East Derbyshire
Ashover, Barlow and Holmesfield, Barrow Hill and New Whittington, Brampton and Walton, Clay Cross North, Clay Cross South, Coal Aston, Dronfield North, Dronfield South, Dronfield Woodhouse, Eckington North, Eckington South, Gosforth Valley, Grassmoor, Killamarsh East, Killamarsh West, Lowgates and Woodthorpe, North Wingfield Central, Renishaw, Ridgeway and Marsh Lane, Tupton, Unstone, Wingerworth.

South Derbyshire
Aston, Church Gresley, Etwall, Hartshorne and Ticknall, Hatton, Hilton, Linton, Melbourne, Midway, Newhall and Stanton, North West, Repton, Seales, Stenson, Swadlincote, Willington and Findern, Woodville.

See also
List of parliamentary constituencies in Derbyshire

References

 
Derbyshire
Wards